Josh Ross may refer to:

 Josh Ross (sprinter) (born 1981), Australian sprinter
 Josh Ross (singer), Canadian country singer and songwriter
 Josh Ross (American football) (born 1999), American football player